Sergey Nikolayevich Kolosov (27 December, 1921 – 11 February, 2012) was a Soviet and Russian film director, screenwriter, and pedagogue. People's Artist of the USSR (1988).

Biography 
He was born in Moscow into a family of actors Nikolai Alekseyevich Kolosov-Mayevsky and Lyubov Isidorovna Frank.

He participated in the Winter and the Great Patriotic War.

From 1948 to 1951, in parallel with his studies in GITIS, he worked as an assistant director in the Russian Army Theatre. From 1952 to 1955, he worked as the director of the Moscow Theater of Satire. In 1955, he went to work in a film studio Mosfilm and debuted in the cinema film Soldier's Heart in 1958.

In 1964, Kolosov as a director took the first Soviet television serial film Call Fire for Ourselves, in which the main role was played by his wife Lyudmila Kasatkina.

At the end of the 1970s, Kolosov became a teacher at the Faculty of Journalism of Moscow State University (Department of Television and Radio Broadcasting).

Kolosov died of a stroke on 11 February 2012 in Moscow. He was buried on 15 February at the Novodevichy Cemetery.

Filmography
 Remember Your Name (1974, director and screenwriter)
 Mother Mary (1982, director and screenwriter)

Bibliography
 Lyudmila Kasatkina, Sergey Kolosov. Fate on Two. Memories in Dialogues (2005)

References

External links
 
 

1921 births
2012 deaths
20th-century Russian screenwriters
Theatre directors from Moscow
Academicians of the National Academy of Motion Picture Arts and Sciences of Russia
Academicians of the Russian Academy of Cinema Arts and Sciences "Nika"
Communist Party of the Soviet Union members
Academic staff of High Courses for Scriptwriters and Film Directors
Academic staff of Moscow State University
Russian Academy of Theatre Arts alumni
People's Artists of the RSFSR
People's Artists of the USSR
Recipients of the Decoration of Honor Meritorious for Polish Culture
Recipients of the Lenin Komsomol Prize
Recipients of the Medal of Zhukov
Recipients of the Order "For Merit to the Fatherland", 2nd class
Recipients of the Order "For Merit to the Fatherland", 3rd class
Recipients of the Order of the Red Banner of Labour
Recipients of the Vasilyev Brothers State Prize of the RSFSR
Male screenwriters
Russian drama teachers
Russian film directors
Russian screenwriters
Russian theatre directors
Soviet drama teachers
Soviet film directors
Soviet screenwriters
Soviet theatre directors
Burials at Novodevichy Cemetery